The Evil Within (also known as ′Passport to Danger′) is a 1970 Indo-Filipino drama film directed by Lamberto V. Avellana and starring Dev Anand and Zeenat Aman.

Plot 

A layered narrative.  Lots of shades of gray.  A palace intrigue meets the corporate mechanism of a criminal enterprise to gain more profit.  The police have their own orders and the organized crime division their own.  All make deals to further their own cause.

Cast 
 Dev Anand
 Kieu Chinh
 Rod Perry
 Zeenat Aman
 Prem Nath
 M. B. Shetty
 Sudesh Issar

References

External links
 

English-language Indian films
Tagalog-language films
1970s Hindi-language films
Indian multilingual films
1970 multilingual films
American multilingual films
Philippine multilingual films